The 1938–39 FAW Welsh Cup is the 58th season of the annual knockout tournament for competitive football teams in Wales.

Key
League name pointed after clubs name.
B&DL - Birmingham & District League
CCL - Cheshire County League
FL D2 - Football League Second Division
FL D3N - Football League Third Division North
FL D3S - Football League Third Division South
LC - Lancashire Combination
MWL - Mid-Wales Football League
ML - Midland League
SFL - Southern Football League
WLN - Welsh League North
WLS D1 - Welsh League South Division One
WCL - West Cheshire League
W&DL - Wrexham & District Amateur League

First round

Second round
14 winners from the First round plus Llay United and Rhayader. Caerphilly United and Llanerch Celts get a bye to the Third round.

Third round
8 winners from the Second round, Caerphilly United and Llanerch Celts plus 16 new clubs.

Fourth round
12 winners from the Third round. Lovell's Athletic get a bye to the Fifth round.

Fifth round
Six winners from the Fourth round, Lovell's Athletic plus nine new clubs.

Sixth round
Eight winners from the Fifth round plus Chester and Newport County.

Seventh round
Two winners from the Sixth round. Cardiff City, South Liverpool and Chester get a bye to the Semifinals.

Semifinal
South Liverpool and Chester played at Goodison Park, the second replay between Cardiff City and Oswestry Town were held at Shrewsbury.

Final
Final were held at Wrexham.

External links
The FAW Welsh Cup

1938-39
Wales
Cup